Mare Crisium  (Latin crisium, the "Sea of Crises") is a lunar mare located in the Moon's Crisium basin, just northeast of Mare Tranquillitatis. The basin is of the Pre-Imbrian period, 4.55 to 3.85 billion years ago.

Characteristics

It has a very flat floor, with a ring of wrinkle ridges (dorsa) toward its outer boundaries. These are Dorsa Tetyaev, Dorsum Oppel, Dorsum Termier, and Dorsa Harker. The cape-like feature protruding into the southeast of the mare is Promontorium Agarum. On the western rim of the mare is the palimpsest Yerkes, and Lick to the southeast is similar. The crater Picard is located just to the east of Yerkes, and northwest of Picard are the craters Peirce and Swift. The ray system of the crater Proclus overlie the northwestern mare. Mare Anguis can be seen northeast of Mare Crisium.

A mass concentration (mascon), or gravitational high, was identified in the center of Mare Crisium from Doppler tracking of the five Lunar Orbiter spacecraft in 1968.  The mascon was confirmed and mapped at higher resolution with later orbiters such as Lunar Prospector and GRAIL.

Names
Like most of the other maria on the Moon, Mare Crisium was named by Giovanni Riccioli, whose 1651 nomenclature system has become standardized.

By the 17th century, Mare Crisium had acquired the name 'Caspian Sea', being labelled as such by Thomas Harriot, Pierre Gassendi and Michael van Langren. Ewen A. Whitaker speculates that it received this name because it occupies roughly the same position on the Moon's face as does the Caspian Sea on Earth, with respect to maps of Europe, North Africa and the Middle East. The English astronomer William Gilbert's map of c.1600 calls it 'Brittania' after Britain.

Observation and exploration
Mare Crisium is just visible from Earth with the naked eye as a small dark spot on the edge of the Moon's face.

It is the site of the crash-landing of Soviet Luna 15 probe in 1969. A soil sample from Mare Crisium was successfully brought to Earth on 22 August 1976 by the Soviet lunar mission Luna 24.

Views

See also
Volcanism on the Moon

References

External links

 High resolution lunar overflight video by Seán Doran, based on LRO data, that passes near Mare Crisium (see album for more); a longer version that starts over the western margin of Mare Fecunditatis is on YouTube

Crisium